Old Croatian or Old Croatian language may refer to:

 Proto-Slavic language (Common Slavic), the form of speech before all Slavic languages diverged from a hypothetical common ancestor
 Croatian recension of the first literary Slavic language; see 
 Chakavian, a South Slavic supradialect that formed the basis of early literary standards in medieval Croatia

See also
 Old Serbian (disambiguation)

Language and nationality disambiguation pages